Coccothrinax yunquensis, the yuruguana del Yunque, is a palm which is endemic to southern Cuba.  It is reported to be restricted to El Yunque, a limestone mountain in Guantánamo Province.

Henderson and colleagues (1995) considered C. yunquensis to be a synonym of Coccothrinax salvatoris.

References

yunquensis
Endemic flora of Cuba
Trees of Cuba
Guantánamo Province
Plants described in 1981